Kirumampakkam is a village in Bahour Commune of Bahour taluk  in the Union Territory of Puducherry, India. It lies on Cuddalore road (NH-45A) at a distance of 15 km from Pondicherry.

Geography
Kirumampakkam is bordered by  Nagappanur village of Tamil nadu in the west, Madalapattu village of Tamil nadu in the north, Pannithittu in east and Pillaiyarkuppam in the south.

Road Network
Kirumampakkam is connected to Puducherry by Cuddalore road (NH-45A). Also Kirumampakkam-Bahour road (RC-27) connects Kirumampakkam with Bahour, its Commune Headquarters. Kirumampakkam provides gateway to Nagappanur village of Tamil nadu.

Gallery

Politics
Kirumampakkam is  a part of Embalam (Union Territory Assembly constituency) which comes under Puducherry (Lok Sabha constituency)

References

External links
 Official website of the Government of the Union Territory of Puducherry

Villages in Puducherry district